David Somers (born 23 March 1966) is a Scottish former football referee.

References

External links
 David Somers, Soccerbase

1966 births
Living people
Scottish football referees
Place of birth missing (living people)
Scottish Football League referees
Scottish Premier League referees
Scottish Professional Football League referees